The  is the 44th edition of the Japan Academy Film Prize, an award presented by the Nippon Academy-Sho Association to award excellence in filmmaking.

Nominees

Awards

References

External links 
  - 

Japan Academy Prize
2020 in Japanese cinema
Japan Academy Film Prize
March 2021 events in Japan